Urbitius or Urbicius may refer to:
Urbicius (eunuch) (Οὐρβίκιος), a powerful Byzantine court official of the 5th century
Urbitius (French Urbice), the first known bishop of Clermont-Ferrand, in the 2nd century
Urbitius (French Urbice), a Bishop of Metz of the fifth century 
Saint Urbicius (French Urbice, d. 805)